Cherry Walk, also known as Cherry Row, is a historic home and farm complex located near Dunbrooke, Essex County, Virginia. The house is dated to the late-18th century, and is a -story, five bay, brick dwelling with a gambrel roof.  Also on the property are the contributing two dairies, a smokehouse, a kitchen, a privy, a large wooden barn encasing an older barn, a plank construction storage shed, a ruinous blacksmith shop, and the sites of other old outbuildings.

It was listed on the National Register of Historic Places in 1983.

References

Houses on the National Register of Historic Places in Virginia
Farms on the National Register of Historic Places in Virginia
Houses in Essex County, Virginia
National Register of Historic Places in Essex County, Virginia